Perkins King (January 12, 1784 – November 29, 1857) was an American lawyer, businessman, and politician who served one term as a U.S. Representative from New York from 1829 to 1831.

Biography
King was born in New Marlborough, Massachusetts on January 12, 1784, a son of Amos King and Lucy (Perkins) King. He was educated in New Marlborough, and moved to Greenville, New York in 1802.

Business career 
After moving to New York, King studied law, and was admitted to the bar.  He also became involved in business ventures, including a woolen mill.

Political career 
He served as Greenville's town clerk in 1815, and was town supervisor from 1817 to 1820.  He was a justice of the peace from 1818 to 1822. He was appointed a judge of the Greene County Court in 1823 and served until becoming First Judge in 1838. He was a member of the New York State Assembly (Greene Co.) in 1827.

Congress 
King was elected as a Jacksonian to the Twenty-first Congress (March 4, 1829 – March 3, 1831). He did not run for reelection in 1830.

Later career and death 
He served as First Judge of the Greene County Court from 1838 to 1847.

King died in Freehold, New York, November 29, 1857.  He was interred in Freehold's Snyder Cemetery.

Sources

1784 births
1857 deaths
New York (state) lawyers
City and town clerks
Town supervisors in New York (state)
New York (state) state court judges
People from Greenville (town), New York
People from Berkshire County, Massachusetts
Members of the New York State Assembly
Jacksonian members of the United States House of Representatives from New York (state)
Burials in New York (state)
19th-century American politicians
Members of the United States House of Representatives from New York (state)